Swindon: The Opera, is an opera written about the large town of Swindon, Wiltshire, England. It was performed at the STEAM Museum.
 
Over twenty songs reflecting the decades were written by Matt Fox, with music composed by Betty Roe.

Cast

References

External links
 

Swindon
2012 operas
English-language operas
Operas
Operas by Betty Roe